An Acoustic Night at the Theatre is the second live album by Dutch symphonic metal band Within Temptation that has been released in October–November 2009.

History 
The album is made up of the acoustic set at Eindhoven's Muziekcentrum Frits Philips, from the band's Theatre Tour, on 30 November 2008. It also includes a new studio recording, "Utopia", a duet with Chris Jones, which was released as a single on 23 October 2009. Drummer Mike Coolen performed on the acoustic set: he later became the band's full-time drummer, replacing Stephen van Haestregt who moved on to new band My Favorite Scar.

Track listing 
 "Towards the End" (Sharon Den Adel, Martijn Spierenburg, Robert Westerholt) – 3:27
 "Stand My Ground" (Den Adel, Daniel Gibson, Han Kooreneef, Westerholt) – 3:53
 "Caged" (Den Adel) – 5:19
 "All I Need" (Den Adel, Westerholt) – 5:20
 "Frozen" (Den Adel, Gibson, Westerholt) – 4:31
 "Somewhere" (feat. Anneke van Giersbergen) (DenAdel, Westerholt) – 4:19
 "The Cross" (Den Adel, Spierenburg, Westerholt) – 4:57
 "Pale" (Den Adel, Westerholt) – 5:08
 "What Have You Done" (feat. Keith Caputo) (Den Adel, Gibson, Westerholt) – 4:33
 "Memories" (Den Adel, Spierenburg, Westerholt) – 4:00
 "Forgiven" (Den Adel, Spierenburg, Westerholt) – 4:42
 "Utopia" (feat. Chris Jones) (Den Adel, Gibson) – 3:49

Bonus tracks 
 "Utopia" (Demo version) – 4:31 (Amazon MP3 Germany)
 "Hand of Sorrow" (Live in Eindhoven 2007) – 5:43 (iTunes)
 "Restless" (acoustic version) – 5:58 (Play.com MP3 UK) (Roadrunner Records Japan CD)

Personnel 

 Peter Brandt – engineer
 Jules Buckley – conductor, orchestral arrangements
 Keith Caputo – vocals
 Mike Coolen – percussion, drums
 Sharon den Adel – composer, vocals
 Rayann Elzein – photography
 Daniel Gibson – arranger, composer, producer
 Stefan Glaumann – mixing
 Olivia Jehel – photography
 Juno Jimmink – engineer, editing
 Ruud Jolie – guitar
 Chris Jones – vocals
 Han Kooreneef – composer
 Patrick Mühren – mixing
 Red Limo String Quartet – violin, cello
 Martijn Spierenburg – composer, keyboards, engineer, editing
 Anneke van Giersbergen – vocals
 Stephen Van Haestregt – drums
 Jeroen van Veen – bass
 Robert Westerholt – guitar, composer
 Within Temptation – producer

Charts

References 

2009 live albums
Within Temptation albums
Sony Records live albums